Brogaig, Norse for Burgh Bay, is a small coastal village, on the northwest coast of the Trotternish peninsula, close to Staffin and Stenscholl, in the Isle of Skye in Scotland and is in the council area of Highland. It is sometimes possible to see sea mammals in the bay.  Brogaig is well known for excellent cycling routes.

References

Populated places in the Isle of Skye